Victor Ivanovich Korovin (December 31, 1936, Leningrad, USSR — July 6, 1991, Leningrad, USSR) was a Soviet Russian painter, a member of the Leningrad Union of Artists, who lived and worked in Leningrad. Victor Korovin regarded as one of representatives of the Leningrad school of painting, most famous for his landscape paintings. Died in an accident.

See also
 Leningrad School of Painting
 List of 20th-century Russian painters
 List of painters of Saint Petersburg Union of Artists
 Saint Petersburg Union of Artists

References

Sources 
 Каталог весенней выставки произведений ленинградских художников 1965 года. — Л: Художник РСФСР, 1970. — с.17.
 Дмитренко А., Фёдорова Н. А где же молодость? О «Выставке молодых» // Смена, 1966, 11 ноября.
 Третья Республиканская художественная выставка «Советская Россия». Каталог. М., МК РСФСР, 1967. C.32.
 Осенняя выставка произведений ленинградских художников 1968 года. Каталог. — Л: Художник РСФСР, 1971. — с.9.
 Весенняя выставка произведений ленинградских художников 1969 года. Каталог. — Л: Художник РСФСР, 1970. — с.11.
 Весенняя выставка произведений ленинградских художников 1971 года. Каталог. — Л: Художник РСФСР, 1972. — с.10.
 По родной стране. Выставка произведений художников Ленинграда. 50 Летию образования СССР посвящвется. Каталог. — Л: Художник РСФСР, 1974. — с.15.
 Наш современник. Зональная выставка произведений ленинградских художников 1975 года. Каталог. — Л: Художник РСФСР, 1980. — с.17.
 Изобразительное искусство Ленинграда. Каталог выставки. — Л: Художник РСФСР, 1976. — с.20.
 Выставка произведений ленинградских художников, посвящённая 60-летию Великого Октября. — Л: Художник РСФСР, 1982. — с.15.
 Зональная выставка произведений ленинградских художников 1980 года. Каталог. — Л: Художник РСФСР, 1983. — с.15.
 Леняшин В. Поиски художественной правды // Художник. 1981, № 1. С.8-17.
 Справочник членов Ленинградской организации Союза художников РСФСР. — Л: Художник РСФСР, 1987. — с.62.
 Связь времен. 1932—1997. Художники — члены Санкт-Петербургского Союза художников России. Каталог выставки. — Санкт — Петербург: ЦВЗ «Манеж», 1997. — с.289.
 Matthew Cullerne Bown. A Dictionary of Twentieth Century Russian And Soviet Painters. 1900 — 1980s. — London: Izomar Limited, 1998.

1936 births
1991 deaths
20th-century Russian painters
Russian male painters
Soviet painters
Socialist realist artists
Leningrad School artists
Members of the Leningrad Union of Artists
Russian landscape painters
20th-century Russian male artists